James Gordon Crowdy (2 July 1847 – 16 December 1918) was an English first-class cricketer and clergyman.

Life and first-class cricket
The son of George Frederick Crowdy, he was born in July 1847 at Highworth, Wiltshire. He was educated at Rugby School, where he played for the school cricket team. From Rugby, he matriculated to Wadham College, Oxford. After graduating from Oxford, he was appointed a minor canon at Winchester Cathedral in 1872, a post he held until 1890. In the same year as his appointment at Winchester, Crowdy made his debut in first-class cricket for the Marylebone Cricket Club against Oxford University at Oxford. He later played county cricket for Hampshire on six occasions between 1875 and 1884. In seven first-class matches, he scored 112 runs at an average of 9.33, with a highest score of 21. Commenting in Scores and Biographies, Arthur Haygarth noted that Crowdy was  "a good hitter and field generally at point or cover-point".

Crowdy was later appointed rector of Sherfield on Loddon in 1890, alongside being an honorary canon and precentor at Winchester Cathedral. He held the rectorship at Sherfield until 1912. He died at Winchester in December 1918, with a memorial to him being erected on the wall inside Winchester Cathedral.

References

External links

1847 births
1918 deaths
People from Highworth
People educated at Rugby School
Alumni of Wadham College, Oxford
19th-century English Anglican priests
English cricketers
Marylebone Cricket Club cricketers
Hampshire cricketers
20th-century English Anglican priests